The Giant's Ring is a henge monument at Ballynahatty, near Shaw's Bridge, Belfast, Northern Ireland. It was originally preserved by Viscount Dungannon. The inscribed stone tablet on the wall surrounding the site which details Viscount Dungannon's interest was carved by Belfast stonecarver Charles A Thompson about c.1919.

The site is a State Care Historic Monument and has ASAI (Area of Significant Archaeological Interest) status.

At least three of the five irregularly spaced gaps in the bank are intentional and possibly original. East of the centre of the enclosure is a small passage tomb with a vestigial passage facing west. There were reports of other tombs outside the enclosure, but there is no trace of these.

History
The Giant's Ring dates from the Neolithic period and was built around 2700BC, meaning that it predates the Egyptian pyramids. The site has had some sort of public use throughout its history. It is near the Shaw's Bridge crossing of the River Lagan, a point which has been used as a crossing of the river since at least the Stone Age. The original purpose of the monument was most likely as a meeting place or as a memorial to the dead.

Archaeologist Michael J. O'Kelly believed that the Giant's Ring, like hundreds of other passage tombs built in Ireland during the Neolithic period, such as Newgrange, showed evidence for a religion which venerated the dead as one of its core principles. He believed that this "cult of the dead" was just one particular form of European Neolithic religion, and that other megalithic monuments displayed evidence for different religious beliefs which were solar, rather than death-orientated.

In the 18th century the site was used for horse racing. A ritual site adjacent to the henge was excavated in the early 1990s by Barrie Hartwell of the Queen's University of Belfast.

See also
List of archaeological sites in County Down
List of megalithic monuments in Ireland

References

Further reading

External links

 Aerial photograph of the Giant's Ring taken in 1984
 Photos of the Giant's Ring with rainbow
Aerial Drone Footage of the Giant's Ring recorded by David Doyle, 2015

Archaeological sites in County Antrim
Geography of Belfast
Tourist attractions in County Antrim
Dolmens in Northern Ireland
Henges